Dudley Wood (born 9 July 1946) is a British former racing driver.

Wood began his professional career in the World Championship for Drivers and Makes in 1981 and finished 13th in points. He then drove in the World Sportscar Championship from 1982 to 1990. He drove in the 24 Hours of Le Mans in 1989 and 1990 driving a Spice SE87C for GP Motorsport/Roy Baker Racing, finishing third and fourth in the C2 class those two years, respectively.

References

1946 births
Living people
British racing drivers
24 Hours of Le Mans drivers
IMSA GT Championship drivers
World Sportscar Championship drivers